Jonkerslân is a village consisting of around 295 inhabitants in the municipality of Opsterland in the east of Friesland, the Netherlands.

The village was first mentioned in 1899 as Jonkersland, and means land of the Jonkheer which is probably a reference to Juw Dekama. Jonkerslân developed into a peat colony in the 18th century. In 1988, it was awarded a village status.

References 

Populated places in Friesland
Geography of Opsterland